Alizee (foaled 26 September 2014) is a retired multiple Group 1 winning Australian thoroughbred racehorse.

Background
Alizee is a half sister to four times stakes winner, Astern, whose main success was the Group 1 Golden Rose Stakes in 2016.

Racing career
Alizee won three Group 1 races in her career, the Flight Stakes, Queen of the Turf Stakes and the Futurity Stakes.

Breeding career
Alizee gave birth to her first foal, a filly out of stallion I Am Invincible in 2021.

Pedigree

References 

Australian racehorses
Individual mares
2014 racehorse births
Racehorses trained in Australia
Racehorses bred in Australia